These are the official results of the Women's 4x100 metres event at the 1991 IAAF World Championships in Tokyo, Japan. Their final was held on Sunday September 1, 1991.

Merlene Frazer, at 17 years 248 days, is, as 2017, the youngest World Champion ever.

Schedule
All times are Japan Standard Time (UTC+9)

Final

Semifinals
Held on Saturday 1991-08-31

Heat 1

Heat 2

See also
 1990 Women's European Championships 4 × 100 m Relay (Split)
 1992 Women's Olympic 4 × 100 m Relay (Barcelona)
 1993 Women's World Championships 4 × 100 m Relay (Stuttgart)

References

 Results

 
Relays at the World Athletics Championships
4 × 100 metres relay
1991 in women's athletics